Frontis Archive Publishing System is a content management system and electronic document and records management system (EDRMS) and is primarily used for publishing historical archives on-lines for researchers to search.

Concept
Frontis was launched in 2008, allowing the publication of both structured and unstructured website content for intelligent searching.  Because it is deployed as a software as a service it is particularly of use to small voluntary organisations such as family history societies and historical organisations who do not have an IT infrastructure and sometimes struggle to find a simple way of publishing their records and archives to reach a wider audience.  Its design and functionality was based on The UK National Archives standard for EDRMS.

A number of heritage organisations use the Frontis system, including the UK's leading Genealogical Society the Society of Genealogists; and Frontis powered sites currently publish over 20 million records on-line (2012 figures).

Awards
In 2008, the innovative concept behind Frontis was recognised when it reached the Final of the Kent Innovation Challenge, a competition sponsored by SEEDA, a UK Government body.

The Frontis powered Families in British India Society web site has won a number of awards from the Federation of Family History Societies including:
 2011 Best Web Site (Large Society);
 2010 Best Web Site (Small Societies);
 2008 Best Web Site (Specialist Society).

References

External links
Some sites using the Frontis System:
 Society of Genealogists Frontis site
 Norfolk Family History Society Frontis site
 Sussex Family History Society Frontis Site
 Parish Register Transcription Society Frontis Site
 FIBIS Site

Content management systems